Moneycarrie railway station was on the Derry Central Railway which ran from Magherafelt to Macfin Junction in Northern Ireland.

History

The station was opened by the Derry Central Railway on 1 May 1894. It was taken over by the Northern Counties Committee in September 1901.

The station closed to passengers on 28 August 1950.

References 

Disused railway stations in County Londonderry
Railway stations opened in 1894
Railway stations closed in 1950
Railway stations in Northern Ireland opened in the 19th century